Filley Township is one of twenty-four townships in Gage County, Nebraska, United States. The population was 292 at the 2020 census. A 2021 estimate placed the township's population at 292.

The Village of Filley lies within the Township.

It was named for Elijah Filley, a pioneer settler.

References

External links
City-Data.com

Townships in Gage County, Nebraska
Townships in Nebraska